Peckemys is an extinct genus of baenid turtle which existed in the Hell Creek Formation, United States during the late Cretaceous period (Maastrichtian age). It was first named by Tyler R. Lyson and Walter G. Joyce in 2009 and the type species is Peckemys brinkman.

References

Baenidae
Prehistoric turtle genera
Late Cretaceous turtles of North America
Hell Creek fauna
Fossil taxa described in 2009